Gonzalo Argote de Molina (1548–1596) was a Spanish writer, historian and genealogist.

Spanish male writers
Spanish genealogists
1548 births
1596 deaths